= Pylae (Arcadia) =

Pylae or Pylai (Ancient Greek: Πύλαι) was a town of ancient Arcadia mentioned by Stephanus of Byzantium.

Its site is unlocated.
